Yevgeny Aleksandrovich Golovin (1 May 1782 – 27 June 1858) was a general in the Imperial Russian Army. In 1811 was appointed commander of Fanagoriyskaya Regiment and steadily rose through the ranks until he was promoted to General of Infantry in 1839. He was also Commander-in-Chief in the Caucasus from 1838 to 1842 and Governor-General of Baltic provinces from 1845 to 1848.

References

Bibliography
 

Imperial Russian Army generals
1782 births
1858 deaths
Russian military personnel of the Caucasian War
Russian commanders of the Napoleonic Wars
Baltic provinces
Caucasus Viceroyalty (1801–1917)
1840s in Georgia (country)
Imperial Moscow University alumni
People of the Caucasian War